General Robert H. "Doc" Foglesong, USAF, Ret., (born 13 July 1945), formerly of Williamson, West Virginia, is a former president of Mississippi State University. He served in the United States Air Force from April 1972 until retirement as general in February 2006.

Education
Foglesong earned the degrees BSc, MSc and PhD at West Virginia University in chemical engineering in 1968, 1969 and 1971 respectively. He holds an honorary Doctorate in Strategic Intelligence, and is a Distinguished Alumnus of West Virginia University. He was selected by the West Virginia Education Alliance as a Graduate of Distinction, and was selected by the West Virginia Executive Magazine as the Patriot of the Year for 2005.

Air Force career
Foglesong attained the rank of four-star general in the United States Air Force 5 November 2001, retiring 1 February 2006 from active duty after 33 years of service. His last post was as Commander of U.S. Air Forces in Europe and of Allied Air Component Command Ramstein where the service's enlisted corps honored him with the Order of the Sword.  General Foglesong commanded six times during his Air Force service including flying and maintenance units, a Numbered Air Force, and a Major Command.  During his final command, General Foglesong continued his established model of using multiple "Combat" programs throughout his command to focus on military discipline and service standards including facilities maintenance, physical readiness, and leadership and mentoring.  While a few Airman saw merit and value of these "Combat" Programs as a renewed emphasis on pride, espirit, and mission; most Airmen sounded their displeasure. Shortly after his retirement, his successor led an effort to reshape these programs begun under Foglesong, dropping two programs, eliminating the "Combat" moniker, and delegating responsibility for 10 of the programs to base and wing commanders.

Awards and decorations

After retirement
Foglesong was President of Mississippi State University from 2006 to 31 March 2008.  Foglesong was the second retired general to hold the office of president at the university; Confederate lieutenant general Stephen D. Lee was the first. Foglesong tackled a number of competing internal and external agendas that he saw as undermining the school's purpose of delivering a quality education to its students. Under pressure from politicians, students and faculty, he resigned in March 2008. During his tenure enrollment rose 6% from 16,206  to 17,127 in 2008. He also oversaw a significant change to the school's facilitites and grounds involving removal of longstanding traditional landscaping including removal of daffodil bulbs which had been on the campus for decades. Much of this landscaping was seen as destructive and shortsighted in nature by students and faculty. Foglesong founded a scholarship program in West Virginia called the Appalachian Leadership and Educational Foundation in 2006. He helped to establish the Appalachian Leadership Honors Program at Mississippi State, which now goes by the name Montgomery Leadership Program in honor of former congressman Sonny Montgomery in 2006. He has also served as a director of now defunct Massey Energy, a major coal company which closed after flagrant safety violations during his tenure.

See also
List of commanders of USAFE

References

External links
Air Force Biography

 http://www.stripes.com/news/combat-shifts-usafe-programs-to-be-retooled-1.47310

Living people
United States Air Force generals
Recipients of the Defense Distinguished Service Medal
Recipients of the Legion of Merit
Order of National Security Merit members
Presidents of Mississippi State University
West Virginia University alumni
People from Williamson, West Virginia
1945 births
Military personnel from West Virginia
Recipients of the Order of the Sword (United States)
Recipients of the Defense Superior Service Medal
Vice Chiefs of Staff of the United States Air Force
Recipients of the Air Force Distinguished Service Medal